9 Persei is a single variable star in the northern constellation Perseus, located around 4,300 light years away from the Sun. It has the Bayer designation i Persei; 9 Persei is the Flamsteed designation. This body is visible to the naked eye as a faint, white-hued star with an apparent visual magnitude of about 5.2. It is moving closer to the Sun with a heliocentric radial velocity of −15.2 km/s. The star is a member of the Perseus OB1 association of co-moving stars.

This is a blue supergiant with a stellar classification of A2 Ia, a massive star that has used up its core hydrogen and is now fusing heavier elements. It is an Alpha Cygni variable (designated V474 Persei), a type of non-radial pulsating variable. It ranges in magnitude from 5.15 down to 5.25. The star has 10.5 times the mass of the Sun and has expanded to 89 times the Sun's radius. It is radiating over 12,000 times the luminosity of the Sun from its swollen photosphere at an effective temperature of 9,840 K.

References

A-type supergiants
Alpha Cygni variables
Perseus (constellation)
Persei, i
Persei, 09
BD+55 598
014489
011060
0685
Persei, V474